Kettlemans Bagel is a privately owned Montreal-style bagel bakery started in 1993. The company is based in Ottawa, Ontario, Canada.
The bagels are made by rolling, kettling and baking traditional Montreal style bagels in a wood-burning oven.

The bagel shop operates 24 hours a day, 7 days a week.  

While known for its bagels, the company is also known for its sandwiches and spreads.

History
Kettlemans Bagel was established in 1993 by co-Founders Joe Bianchini and Craig Buckley.

References

External links
Official Website
Eats & Drinks - Vinacircle

Canadian companies established in 1993
Companies based in Ottawa
Restaurants established in 1993
Bagel companies
1993 establishments in Ontario